1100 series may refer to:

Japanese train types
 Hankyu 1100 series EMU operated by Hankyu Corporation between 1956 and 1989
 Izuhakone 1100 series EMU operated by the Izuhakone Railway

Computing
 UNIVAC 1100 series, the earlier transistorized computer line